Sevyn Banks (born September 30, 1999) is an American football cornerback for the LSU Tigers. He previously played at Ohio State.

Early life and high school career
Banks attended The First Academy in Orlando, Florida his freshman and sophomore years before transferring to Jones in Orlando for his final two years. He played in the 2018 Under Armour All-America Game. Banks committed to Ohio State University to play college football.

College career

Ohio State 
Banks played his first two years at Ohio State in 2018 and 2019 as a backup, recording 12 tackles and one interception. As a junior in 2020, he became a starter. He finished the season with 23 tackles and fumble recovered for a touchdown.

LSU 

On April 19, 2022, Banks transferred to LSU.

Personal life
His brother, Marcell Harris, plays in the NFL.

References

External links
Ohio State Buckeyes bio

Living people
Players of American football from Orlando, Florida
American football cornerbacks
Ohio State Buckeyes football players
1999 births
LSU Tigers football players